The Petite rivière Pot au Beurre (in English: Little River butter pot) is a tributary of the rivière Pot au Beurre. It flows north into the municipalities of Saint-Robert and Yamaska in the Pierre-De Saurel Regional County Municipality (MRC), in the administrative region of Montérégie, on the South Shore of the St. Lawrence River, in Quebec, Canada.

Geography 
The main neighboring hydrographic slopes of the Little Pot-au-Beurre river are:
 North side: Yamaska River, lake Saint-Pierre;
 East side: Yamaska river, Le Petit Chenail;
 South side: Landfill of the Dix de Sainte-Sophie;
 West side: Bellevue River, rivière Pot au Beurre, Richelieu River.

  towards the north first in an agricultural zone, then in a marsh zone, up to its mouth.

Toponymy 
This toponym is linked to the "Pot au Beurre river" of which it is a tributary.

The toponym "Petite rivière Pot-au-Beurre" was officially registered on August 28, 1980, at the Commission de toponymie du Québec.

See also 
 List of rivers of Quebec

References 

Rivers of Montérégie
Pierre-De Saurel Regional County Municipality